Munditia meridionalis is a species of small sea snail, a marine gastropod mollusk, in the family Liotiidae.

Description
The height of this minute shell attains 0.75 mm and its diameter 0.50 mm. The delicate, white-gray shell has a depressed trochoidal shape and is deeply umbilicate. it contains 4 whorls. The nuclear whorls are slightly nepionic, and shapelessly turgid, but the penultimate and body whorl are very well sculptured and defined, being acutely spirally bicarinate. The aperture is round. The peristome is continuous. It is slightly thickened at the base around the umbilicus. Around the umbilicus, likewise, a third keel, crenulate, and not so acute, revolves. The dark red-brown operculum is multispiral with a not quite central nucleus. A pale straw-coloured epidermis covers the whole surface uniformly.

Distribution
This species occurs in subantarctic waters off the South Orkney Islands and the South Shetland Islands at depths between 16 m and 18 m.

References

External links
 To World Register of Marine Species

meridionalis
Gastropods described in 1912